James Houston IV (born November 16, 1998) is an American football outside linebacker for the Detroit Lions of the National Football League (NFL). He played college football at Florida before transferring to Jackson State.

Early life and high school
Houston grew up in Fort Lauderdale, Florida and attended the American Heritage School. He was rated a three-star recruit and committed to play college football at Florida over offers Wisconsin, South Carolina, Michigan, and Miami.

College career
Houston began his college career at Florida. He redshirted his true freshman season after being suspended along with eight other players due to his involvement in a credit card fraud scheme. As a redshirt freshman, Houston played in all 13 of the Gators' games as a reserve linebacker and made 28 tackles with two tackles for loss, two forced fumbles, and one blocked punt. He had 38 tackles with six tackles for loss and 3.5 sacks in his redshirt sophomore season. Houston recorded 37 tackles, 3.5 tackles for a loss, one sack, and one forced fumble as a redshirt junior. Following the end of the season he entered the NCAA transfer portal.

Houston ultimately transferred to Jackson State. In his only season with the Tigers, he recorded 70 tackles, 24.5 tackles for loss, 16.5 sacks, seven forced fumbles, and an interception and was named first-team All-Southwestern Athletic Conference.

Professional career

Houston was selected in the sixth round, 217th overall, by the Detroit Lions in the 2022 NFL Draft. He was waived on August 30, 2022 and signed to the practice squad the next day. He was promoted to the active roster on November 28. During a Thanksgiving Day matchup against the Buffalo Bills, Houston recorded 2 sacks, 2 solo tackles, and a fumble recovery in just five defensive snaps.  He followed this up with a sack in each of his next 3 games, becoming only the third player in NFL history (along with Terrell Suggs and Santana Dotson) to open his career with a 4 game sack streak.

References

External links
 Detroit Lions bio
Florida Gators bio
Jackson State Tigers bio

1998 births
Living people
Jackson State Tigers football players
Players of American football from Fort Lauderdale, Florida
American football defensive ends
American football linebackers
Florida Gators football players
Detroit Lions players